The 1978 AIAW Women's College World Series (WCWS) was held in Omaha, Nebraska on May 25–28.  Sixteen fastpitch softball teams emerged from regional tournaments to  meet in the national collegiate softball championship.

Teams
The double-elimination tournament included these teams:

 Arizona State
 Cal Poly–Pomona
 Illinois State
 Massachusetts
 Minnesota
 Nebraska–Omaha
 Northern Colorado
 Oregon State
 Portland State
 South Carolina
 Southern Illinois
 Southwest Missouri State
 Stephen F. Austin
 Texas Woman's
 UCLA
 Utah State

UCLA won its first national championship by holding all five of its opponents scoreless through the tournament and beating Northern Colorado, 3-0, in the final game.  Lady Bruins' center fielder Sue Enquist was named the Most Outstanding Player of the tournament.

Bracket

Source:

Ranking

See also

References

Women's College World Series
Soft
Women's College World Series
Women's College World Series
Women's College World Series
Women's sports in Nebraska